Ravensdale  may refer to:
Ravensdale, County Louth, Ireland
Ravensdale, New South Wales, Australia
Ravensdale, Washington, United States
RavensDale, a video game